The Long Island Ducks are an American professional minor-league baseball team based on Long Island in Central Islip, New York. The Ducks compete in the North Division of the Atlantic League of Professional Baseball (ALPB), an independent "partner league" of Major League Baseball. The Ducks played their first season in 2000, two years after the ALPB inaugural season. Since their inception the Ducks' home ballpark has been Fairfield Properties Ballpark, formerly known as Bethpage Ballpark (2010-2020), Suffolk County Sports Park (1999), EAB Park (2000–2001), and Citibank Park (2002–2009). The "Ducks" name refers to Long Island's duck-farming heritage (itself represented by the Big Duck ferrocement) and recalls the former Long Island Ducks professional ice hockey team. The team's first manager was Bud Harrelson, a part-owner of the team and a former major league player.

History
The Ducks, the only professional baseball team located on suburban Long Island, began play in 2000, and from 2000 to 2019 won four ALPB championships. Team owner Frank Boulton expressed his contentment with the Ducks in 2007 to Baseball America, saying, "The Long Island Ducks are the best thing I've ever done in baseball."

A league rivalry developed between the Ducks and the Bridgeport Bluefish, with the two teams contesting the "Ferry Cup" from 2009 until the latter team's termination in 2017. The Ferry Cup name referred to its sponsor, the Bridgeport & Port Jefferson Steamboat Company, which was utilized by the teams and their fans for traveling to each ballpark.

Former Major League Baseball (MLB) player and MLB Hall of Fame member Gary Carter managed the Ducks in 2009. Following Carter's death in 2012, the Ducks dedicated the season to his memory and wore a commemorative patch on their uniforms.

Former Major League Baseball players to have played on the Ducks include Dontrelle Willis, Ramon Castro, Ben Broussard, Leo Rosales, Josh Barfield, Bill Hall, Bryant Nelson, Ian Snell, and Lew Ford. Rich Hill played with the Ducks in 2015, prior to his return to the majors in 2016 with the Boston Red Sox. In 2017, pitcher Éric Gagné attempted a professional baseball comeback with the Ducks; that same year, Nate Freiman, Henderson Alvarez, Quintin Berry, and Tim Melville played with the Ducks and later joined an MLB organization or foreign professional league.

Logos and uniforms

The official colors of the Long Island Ducks are black, green, orange, and white.  The primary logo features the "Ducks" wordmark in orange with black outline.  The wordmark begins with a stylized, cartoon duck head in the form of a capital cursive "D."

Since 2015, OC Sports has been the official on-field headwear of the Atlantic League. The home caps are black with the duck head logo centered on the front. The away caps are black with an orange brim and the duck head logo. Batting helmets are black with the webbed-foot logo.

The Ducks wear uniforms produced by Rawlings. The home jersey is white with black pinstripes with the "Ducks" wordmark centered across the front.  The numbering on the jersey is primarily in green with white outline and black drop shadow.  The away jerseys are grey with the "Long Island" cursive wordmark centered across in green with white and orange outline.  The numbering is in green with white outline and orange drop shadow.  The alternate is an orange jersey with the "Ducks" word mark centered across the chest.

Season-by-season records

 4 Atlantic League Championships (2004, 2012, 2013, 2019)

Radio

All games are broadcast over the Ducks' official YouTube channel, website, and (beginning 2017) Facebook Live. For 2017, WRHU/88.7 served as the radio home of the Ducks (replacing previous broadcaster WRCN-FM 103.9). Michael Polak, Chris King, and David Weiss currently serve as the team's official broadcasters.

Mascot

The Long Island Ducks' official mascot is an anthropomorphic duck named QuackerJack.  He wears the Ducks' full home white uniform with green and white sneakers.  He debuted on March 18, 2000, at then-Citibank Park.  His name alludes to a popular baseball game food produced by the Cracker Jack brand, and the quacking sound of a duck.

Current Roster

Retired numbers
 4 (Justin Davies) Outfielder and franchise record holder for stolen bases. Retired on June 18, 2015
 16 (Ray Navarrete) Utility player and franchise record holder for runs, hits, home runs, RBI, and doubles. Retired on August 16, 2015
 42 (Jackie Robinson) Second baseman. Retired throughout professional baseball on April 15, 1997
 3 (Bud Harrelson) Part owner of Long Island Ducks. Retired on August 3, 2018

References

External links

Long Island Ducks official website

 
Atlantic League of Professional Baseball teams
Sports in Long Island
Baseball teams in the New York metropolitan area
Baseball teams established in 1998
1998 establishments in New York (state)